Clement Allan Tisdell (18 November 1939 – 14 July 2022 ) was an Australian economist and Emeritus Professor at the University of Queensland. He was best known for his work in environmental and ecological economics.

Personal life
Tisdell was born in Taree, New South Wales on 18 November 1939.

He died on 14 July 2022 in Brisbane, Queensland.

Academic background

Clem Tisdell obtained his bachelor's degree in Commerce (majoring in Economics) from the University of New South Wales in 1961 and his doctorate in Economics from the Australian National University in 1964. During his professorship he has occupied various academic offices: acting head of the Department of Economics at the Australian National University, dean of the Faculty of Economics and Commerce at the University of Newcastle, deputy director of the School of Marine Sciences and head of the Department of the School of Economics at the University of Queensland.

Academic interests

While Clem Tisdell was commonly recognised as an ecological economist, his research interests were diverse. His contribution to the literature on the environment, biodiversity conservation and sustainable development notwithstanding, his research and writing encompassed various areas that included poverty, trade and globalisation, economic development, welfare economics, tourism, natural resources, the economics and socioeconomics of China and India, socioeconomic gender issues, economic theory (e.g., bounded rationality and economic evolution) and the history of economic thought.

Clem Tisdell was among the top three most prolific economists in Australia. Apart from academic articles, he authored microeconomics textbooks and monographs on the economics of environmental conservation. Under the RePEc project (Research Papers in Economics), Tisdell was ranked among the top 5% of all registered economic authors. In terms of the 'number of distinct works' produced, RePEc ranked him No. 11 globally.

References

Selected publications

 Books

 
 
 

 Journal articles

 
 
See also: Nicholas Georgescu-Roegen, Herman Daly, Robert Solow and Joseph Stiglitz.
 
 
 
 
 
 
Also available online as: 

 Papers

 Tisdell, Clem (2005). Elephants and polity in ancient India as exemplified by Kautilya's Arthasastra (Science of Polity). Working papers in Economics, Ecology and the Environment, No. 120. School of Economics, University of Queensland: Brisbane, Queensland.
Tisdell, Clem (2009). The production of biofuels: welfare and environmental consequences for Asia. Working papers in Economics, Ecology and the Environment, No. 159. School of Economics, University of Queensland: Brisbane, Queensland.

External links

 Clem Tisdell's homepage at the University of Queensland's webpage (contains CV and list of working papers, books and journal articles)
 Clem Tisdell's publications that are available at the University of Queensland Library collection (listed in reverse chronological order)
 Clem Tisdell's Economics, Ecology and Environment Working Paper series (downloadable)
 (Interview with Clem Tisdell by Wildlife Tourism Australia)

1939 births
2022 deaths
People from Taree
Australian economists
University of New South Wales alumni
Ecological economists
Academic staff of the University of Queensland